Uchila is a village near Yermal in Udupi taluk in Udupi district, Karnataka, India.

Location
It is on the way from Mangalore to Udupi, on National Highway 66 previously known as National Highway 17. It is basically a fishing village on the Arabian Sea coast.
There is also very old Lord Shiv temple. It has history and Parashurama has history to the place of Uchila.

Places of interest
Mahalakshmi temple, famous for mogaveeras, is situated here.

Villages in Udupi district